Dagoberto Portillo Gamero (born November 16, 1979) is a Salvadoran former football goalkeeper. He was banned for life in 2013, for match fixing while playing for the El Salvador national football team.

Career

Club
He began his football career with Alianza in 1999. In 2001, he transferred to Luís Ángel Firpo where he remained until 2003. That same year he was transferred to C.D. Chalatenango, with whom he played for the Clausura 2004. For the Apertura 2004, he arrived at Isidro Metapán, for whom he played until 2006, until he rejoined with Alianza again. For the Apertura 2008, Portillo returned to form part of the Isidro Metapán squad. He later would go on to join FAS for the Apertura 2009 before leaving to Once Municipal for the Apertura 2010. Though he returned to Luís Ángel Firpo for the 2011 season and has remained there ever since.

International
Dagoberto Portillo began his international career with El Salvador's U20 national team in 1995. Through the years, he also went on to form part of the El Salvador's U21 and the El Salvador's U23. He made his debut with the senior team in a March 2007 friendly match against Honduras, under then coach Carlos de los Cobos. During his career in the senior team, he has been injured numerous times; one game against Costa Rica in 2010 led him to the hospital.

On September 20, 2013, Portillo was one of 14 Salvadoran players banned for life due to their involvement with match fixing.

References

External links
 

1979 births
Living people
Sportspeople from San Salvador
Association football goalkeepers
Salvadoran footballers
El Salvador international footballers
2007 UNCAF Nations Cup players
2007 CONCACAF Gold Cup players
2011 Copa Centroamericana players
2011 CONCACAF Gold Cup players
2013 Copa Centroamericana players
2013 CONCACAF Gold Cup players
Alianza F.C. footballers
C.D. Luis Ángel Firpo footballers
C.D. Chalatenango footballers
A.D. Isidro Metapán footballers
C.D. FAS footballers
Once Municipal footballers
Sportspeople involved in betting scandals
Sportspeople banned for life